Rosado is the Spanish word for the color pink.

Rosado may also refer to:
 Rosado (wine), a type of wine in Spanish-speaking countries
 Rosado (surname), people with the surname
 Governador Dix-Sept Rosado, a municipality in the state of Rio Grande do Norte in the Northeast region of Brazil